Valery Petrovich Fateyev (born 2 June 1946) is a Russian politician who served as the 1st Governor of Smolensk Oblast from 1991 to 1993. He was also member of the first Federation Council of Russia from 1993 to 1995.

Biography
Valery Fateyev was born in Gorky (Nizhny Novgorod), on 2 June 1946.

He graduated from the Gorky State University and the All-Union Correspondence Financial and Economic Institute. From 1976 to 1989, he worked deputy chief engineer of Vyazma branch of the Moscow searchlight plant.

In October 1991, until the 11 April 1993, he was the 1st Governor of the Smolensk Oblast.

From January 1994 to January 1996, he was a Member of the Federal Assembly of the Russian Federation.

Fateyev was kidnapped in Chechnya, near Achkhoy-Martan on his way to Grozny on January 11, 1999. There he was heading to find a wife abducted in November 1998. They were released from captivity in early March 2000.

References

1946 births
Living people
Governors of Smolensk Oblast
Members of the Federation Council of Russia (1994–1996)
Politicians from Nizhny Novgorod
Kidnapped Russian people